Nwal-Endéné “Endy“ Miyem (born 15 May 1988) is a French professional basketball player. She played from 2016 to 2018 at club level as a power forward for PF Schio. In 2018, she was signed to the Minnesota Lynx after being waived before the regular season. She has played 70 matches for the France women's national basketball team since 2008. She has competed in the 2012 Summer Olympics. where the French won the silver medal.

Miyem also supports hip-hop group Eklectik in their "Face Cancer" initiative, a project aimed at raising awareness of cancer through music.

WNBA career statistics

Regular season

|-
| align="left" | 2018
| align="left" | Minnesota
| 20 || 1 || 5.1 || .324 || .200 || 1.000 || 0.6 || 0.3 || 0.1 || 0.1 || 0.2 || 1.4
|-
| align="left" | Career
| align="left" | 1 year, 1 team
| 20 || 1 || 5.1 || .324 || .200 || 1.000 || 0.6 || 0.3 || 0.1 || 0.1 || 0.2 || 1.4

References

External links

1988 births
Living people
Basketball players at the 2012 Summer Olympics
Basketball players at the 2016 Summer Olympics
Basketball players at the 2020 Summer Olympics
French expatriate basketball people in Italy
French expatriate basketball people in Russia
French expatriate basketball people in the United States
French women's basketball players
Knights of the Ordre national du Mérite
Medalists at the 2012 Summer Olympics
Medalists at the 2020 Summer Olympics
Minnesota Lynx players
Olympic basketball players of France
Olympic medalists in basketball
Olympic silver medalists for France
Olympic bronze medalists for France
Power forwards (basketball)
Sportspeople from Reims
France women's national basketball team players